John Piton (20 April 1865 – 20 July 1942) was a South African first-class cricketer. He played for Transvaal in the 1889–90 Currie Cup.

References

External links
 

1865 births
1942 deaths
South African cricketers
Gauteng cricketers